Muroia is a genus of fungi in the family Lophiostomataceae. A monotypic genus, it contains the single species Muroia nipponica.

References

External links
Index Fungorum

Lophiostomataceae
Monotypic Dothideomycetes genera